Hon. Frank Woodbury Robinson (November 27, 1853 – February 16, 1922) was an American politician and lawyer from Maine. Robinson served as Mayor of Portland, Maine from 1899 to 1900.

Robinson graduated from Portland High School in 1873 and Harvard Law School in 1875. He was admitted to the bar in Cumberland County, Maine in October 1875 and became a member of the law firm Libby, Robinson & Turner. Two years later, in 1877, Robinson was appointed assistant attorney for Cumberland County. He replaced Moses M. Butler, who had been elected mayor of Portland. In 1888, he was elected Cumberland County District Attorney. Re-elected twice as District Attorney, he was then appoint judge of the Portland Municipal Court in 1893. He held that position until March 1899, when he was elected mayor.

Robinson married Ida Frances Wheeler (1855–1913) and died in Portland at the age of 68.

References

1853 births
1922 deaths
District attorneys in Cumberland County, Maine
Harvard Law School alumni
Maine lawyers
Mayors of Portland, Maine
Lawyers from Portland, Maine
19th-century American lawyers